Ewald Steenkamp (born 18 April 1988) is a Namibian cricketer.  Steenkamp is a right-handed batsman who fields as a wicket-keeper. He played five matches in the Under-19 World Cup of February 2006, during which he top-scored with 17.

In August 2007, Steenkamp was a part of the Namibia Under-19 squad which won the Africa Under-19 Championship, during which he scored a then career-best 82 not out against Kenya.

Generally speaking, he occupies the middle order, letting the Namibian youth team ride on his wicket-keeping rather than trying his hand at bowling. Steenkamp made his debut for the Namibia A team in 2007, though he was neither called up to bat or bowl, and took no catches from behind the stumps. Steenkamp's debut first-class appearance came in the South African Airways Provincial Challenge against Griqualand West in November 2007. Despite not making any first-class appearances in 2008-09, Steenkamp made his debut first-class half-century in 2009-10.

External links
Ewaid Steenkamp at Cricket Archive 

1988 births
White Namibian people
Namibian Afrikaner people
Namibian people of Dutch descent
Namibian people of German descent
Cricketers from Windhoek
Namibian cricketers
Living people
Wicket-keepers